Forsythia suspensa, commonly known as weeping forsythia or golden-bell, is a species of flowering plant in the family Oleaceae, it is native to China.

Taxonomy
The Latin epithet of suspensa is derived from suspensus meaning suspended. It was first described and published in Enum. Pl. Obs. Vol.1 on page 39 in 1804.

Description
Its flowers are golden-yellow and they bloom March to April. Leaves are green in color, broadly-ovate, and simple.

It can be grown as a weeping shrub on stream banks and can be identified by its pale flowers. Garden cultivars can be found. It is a spring flowering shrub, with yellow flowers. It is grown and prized for its toughness. Before Forsythia × intermedia was known as a true wild Chinese species, F. suspensa was considered one of its parents.

Distribution and habitat 
Forsythia suspensa is native to China. It is introduced in Japan, Spain, Bulgaria, Czechoslovakia, Korea, as well as some parts of the United States. It grows in thickets or grassy areas on slopes and valleys.

Uses
It is one of the 50 fundamental herbs used in traditional Chinese medicine. It contains the lignans Pinoresinol and phillyrin.  
The main active component isolated from Forsythia Fructus (the dried fruit of Forsythia suspensa) Forsythiaside A exhibits significant activities in treating various diseases, including inflammation, virus infection, neurodegeneration, oxidative stress, liver injury, and bacterial infection.

References

External links

Forsythia - Forsythia suspensa, species information page - at Brickfields Country Park.
Forsythia suspensa page 

Forsythieae
Medicinal plants of Asia
Plants used in traditional Chinese medicine
Plants described in 1804
Garden plants
Flora of China